Heritage Hills is a neighborhood in the City of Lone Tree, Colorado. A former census-designated place (CDP), the population was 658 at the 2000 census. The Lone Tree Post Office (ZIP Code 80124) serves the area.

Geography
Heritage Hills is located at coordinates .

See also

Outline of Colorado
Index of Colorado-related articles
State of Colorado
Colorado cities and towns
Colorado census designated places
Colorado counties
Douglas County, Colorado
List of statistical areas in Colorado
Front Range Urban Corridor
North Central Colorado Urban Area
Denver-Aurora-Boulder, CO Combined Statistical Area
Denver-Aurora-Broomfield, CO Metropolitan Statistical Area

References

External links

Douglas County website

Geography of Douglas County, Colorado
Former census-designated places in Colorado
Denver metropolitan area